The Kaiwharawhara Stream is a stream in the North Island of New Zealand - it flows through the northwestern part of New Zealand's capital, Wellington.  Its headwaters lie within the suburb of Karori, and it passes through other suburbs and Otari-Wilton's Bush before reaching the western shore of Wellington Harbour in Kaiwharawhara near the terminal of the  Interislander Ferry.  Part of its length runs roughly alongside the Johnsonville Branch railway, a branch line that  once formed part of the North Island Main Trunk Railway - the latter now passes over the stream near its mouth.

Much of this area consists of parkland and other reserves, though the water suffers from pollution in the form of stormwater and runoff associated with urban land-use.

It is piped for much of the route, from Zealandia (wildlife sanctuary) to Otari-Wilton's Bush. Near its mouth at Kaiwharawhara, a  tunnel was built as an air-raid shelter in 1944 and the stream was diverted through it after the war, to improve flood protection and allow for additional oil storage tanks.

References

Rivers of the Wellington Region